"Fake Star" is Ken Hirai's 27th single. The song is described as being an up-tempo song. It was used as the Meiji Confectionery "Fran Aromatier" CM song. This is his third single of 2007.

In the lyrics, Ken references the lyrics of his previous hit single, "Pop Star", and the song serves as a mirror-image of that single.

Track listing

CD version
Fake Star 
Fake Star: Ken's Swingin' Jazz
Pop Star x Fake Star (Mash up) remixed by Metalmouse 
Fake Star: Less vocal

Charts 
Oricon Sales Chart (Japan)

2007 songs
2007 singles
Ken Hirai songs
Songs written by Ken Hirai
Defstar Records singles